Isarn may refer to:
Isarn of Pallars (died 948)
Isarn, Bishop of Grenoble (950–976)
Isarn (troubadours), troubadour
Isarn (inquisitor), inquisitor

People with the given name
Isarn Marques, troubadour
Isarn Rizol, troubadour

People with the surname
William Isarn (died 1010s), Count of Ribagorza

See also
Isard (disambiguation)